Fenethylline (BAN, USAN) is a codrug of amphetamine and theophylline and a prodrug to both.  It is also spelled phenethylline and fenetylline (INN); other names for it are amphetaminoethyltheophylline and amfetyline. The drug was marketed for use as a psychostimulant under the brand names Captagon, Biocapton, and Fitton.

History
Fenethylline was first synthesized by the German Degussa AG in 1961 and used for around 25 years as a milder alternative to amphetamine and related compounds. Although there are no FDA-approved indications for fenethylline, it was used in the treatment of "hyperkinetic children" (what would now be referred to as attention deficit hyperactivity disorder) and, less commonly, for narcolepsy and depression. One of the main advantages of fenethylline was that it does not increase blood pressure to the same extent as an equivalent dose of amphetamine and so could be used in patients with cardiovascular conditions.

Fenethylline was considered to have fewer side effects and less potential for abuse than amphetamine. Nevertheless, fenethylline was listed in 1981 as a schedule I controlled substance in the US, and it became illegal in most countries in 1986 after being listed by the World Health Organization for international scheduling under the Convention on Psychotropic Substances, even though the actual incidence of fenethylline abuse was quite low.

Pharmacology
The fenethylline molecule results when theophylline is covalently linked with amphetamine by an alkyl chain.

Fenethylline is metabolized by the body to form two drugs, amphetamine (24.5% of oral dose) and theophylline (13.7% of oral dose), both of which are active stimulants. The physiological effects of fenethylline therefore seem to result from a combination of these two compounds, although how is not entirely clear.

Abuse and illegal trade

Abuse of fenethylline of the brand name Captagon is common in the Middle East, and counterfeit versions of the drug continue to be available despite its illegality. Captagon is much less common outside of the Middle East, to the point that police may not recognize the drug.

Many of these counterfeit "Captagon" tablets actually contain other amphetamine derivatives that are easier to produce, but are pressed and stamped to look like Captagon pills. Some counterfeit Captagon pills analysed do contain fenethylline however, indicating that illicit production of this drug continues to take place. These illicit pills often contain "a mix of amphetamines, caffeine[,] and various fillers", which are sometimes referred to as ‘'captagon with a lowercase C.

Fenethylline is a popular drug in Western Asia, and is allegedly used by militant groups in Syria. It is manufactured locally by a cheap and simple process. In July 2019 in Lebanon, captagon was sold for $1.50 to $2.00 a pill. In 2021 in Syria, low-quality pills were sold locally for less than $1, while high-quality pills are increasingly smuggled abroad and may cost upwards of $14 each in Saudi Arabia.

According to some leaks, militant groups also export the drug in exchange for weapons and cash. According to Abdelelah Mohammed Al-Sharif, secretary general of the National Committee for Narcotics Control and assistant director of Anti-Drug and Preventative Affairs, 40% of the drug users who fall in the 12–22 age group in Saudi Arabia are addicted to fenethylline.

Increasing usage and seizures
According to UNODC, Saudi Arabia received seven tonnes of Captagon in 2010, a third of world supply. In 2017, Captagon was the most popular recreational drug in the Arabian peninsula.

On 26 October 2015, a member of the Saudi royal family, Prince Abdel Mohsen Bin Walid Bin Abdulaziz, and four others were detained in Beirut on charges of drug trafficking after airport security discovered two tons of Captagon (fenethylline) pills and some cocaine on a private jet scheduled to depart for the Saudi capital of Riyadh. The following month, Agence France Press reported that the Turkish authorities had seized 2 tonnes of Captagon during raids in the Hatay region on the Syrian border. The pills, almost 11 million of them, had been produced in Syria and were being shipped to countries in the Arab states of the Persian Gulf.

On 31 December 2015, the Lebanese Army announced that it had discovered two large scale drug production workshops in the north of the country. Large quantities of Captagon pills were seized. Two days earlier three tons of Captagon and hashish were seized at Beirut Airport. The drugs were concealed in school desks being exported to Egypt.

References to the drug were found on a mobile phone used by Mohamed Lahouaiej Bouhlel, a French-Tunisian who killed 84 civilians in Nice on Bastille Day, 2016.

In May 2017, French customs at Charles de Gaulle airport seized 750,000 Captagon pills transported from Lebanon and destined for Saudi Arabia. That year, two other separate discoveries of the pills were also made at Charles de Gaulle Airport in January, heading for the Czech Republic, and in February, hidden in steel moulds. Further investigation showed that the seized products mainly contained a mixture of amphetamine and theophylline.

In January 2018, Saudi Arabia seized 1.3 million Captagon pills at the Al-Haditha crossing near the border with Jordan. In December 2018, Greece intercepted a Syrian ship sailing for Libya, carrying six tonnes of processed cannabis and 3 million Captagon pills. In July 2019, a shipment of 33 million Captagon pills, weighing 5.25 tonnes, was seized in Greece coming from Syria. Later that month, 800,000 Captagon pills were found on a boat in the United Arab Emirates. In August 2019, Saudi customs at Al-Haditha seized 2,579,000 Captagon pills found inside a truck and a private vehicle.

In February 2020, the UAE found 35 million Captagon pills in a shipment of electric cables from Syria to Jebel Ali. In April 2020, Saudi Arabia seized 44.7 million Captagon pills smuggled from Syria, and imposed an import ban on fruits and vegetables from Lebanon citing drug smuggling concerns, causing the price of Lebanese lettuce to plummet. On 1 July 2020, an anti-drug operation coordinated in Italy by the Italian Guardia di Finanza and Customs and Monopolies Agency seized 14 tonnes of amphetamines, labeled as Captagon, smuggled from Syria and initially hypothesized by the Italian authorities to have been produced by ISIS, which were found in three shipping containers filled with around 84 million pills, in the southern port of Salerno. In November 2020, Egypt managed to seize two shipments of Captagon pills at Damietta port coming from Syria, the first had 3,251,500 tablets, while the second contained 11 million tablets. In December 2020, Italian authorities seized at Napoli about 14 tonnes of Captagon arriving from Latakia, Syria, and heading towards Libya, including about 84 million pills, worth around $1 billion.

In January 2021, Egyptian authorities seized eight tons of Captagon and another eight tons of Hashish at Port Said, from a shipment which arrived from Lebanon. In February 2021, Lebanese customs seized at Beirut port a shipment of 5 million Captagon pills hidden in a tile-making machine, intended for Greece and Saudi Arabia. In April 2021, Saudi authorities discovered 5.3m Captagon pills hidden in fruits imported from Lebanon.

Production in Syria
The drug is playing a role in the Syrian Civil War. The production and sale of fenethylline generates large revenues which are likely used to fund weapons, as well as combatants on different sides using the stimulant to keep them fighting. Poverty and international sanctions which limit legal exports are contributing factors.

In May 2021, the UK newspaper The Guardian described the effects of Captagon production in Syria on the economy as a dirty business which is creating a near narco-state. Drug money flowing into Syria is destabilizing legitimate businesses, positioning it as the global centre of Captagon production, with increased industrialization, adaptation, and technical sophistication. In June 2021, Saudi authorities at Jeddah port seized 14 million Captagon tablets hidden inside a shipment of iron plates coming from Lebanon. In the same month, Saudi authorities seized a shipment of 4.5 million Captagon pills, smuggled inside several orange cartons, also at a Jeddah port. In July 2021, Saudi customs discovered 2.1 million Captagon pills at Al-Haditha hidden in a tomato paste shipment.The New York Times reported in December 2021 that the Syrian Army's elite 4th Armoured Division, commanded by Maher al-Assad, oversees much of the production and distribution of Captagon, among other drugs. The unit controls manufacturing facilities, packing plants, and smuggling networks all across Syria (which have started to also move crystal meth). The division's security bureau, headed by Maj. Gen. Ghassan Bilal, provides protection for factories and along smuggling routes to the port city Latakia and to border crossings with Jordan and Lebanon. In the wake of sanctions against the Assad government, Jihad Yazigi, editor of The Syria Report'', said Captagon is now "Syria’s most important source of foreign currency".

Synthesis

Theophylline (1) is alkylated with 2-bromochloroethane [107-04-0] (2) to give 7-(2-Chloroethyl)theophylline (aka Benaphyllin, Eupnophile) [5878-61-5] (3). Displacment of the remaining halogen leaving group by the primary amine in amphetamine [300-62-9] (4) gives fenethylline (5).

See also 
 Amfecloral
 Cafedrine
 Famprofazone
 Fencamine
 Theodrenaline
 ZDCM-04

References 

Substituted amphetamines
Xanthines
Codrugs
Adenosine receptor antagonists
Norepinephrine-dopamine releasing agents
Stimulants
1961 introductions
Illegal drug trade